NGC 4873 is a lenticular galaxy located about 270 million light-years away in the constellation of Coma Berenices. NGC 4873 was discovered by astronomer Heinrich d'Arrest on May 10, 1863. The galaxy is a member of the Coma Cluster.

Other images

See also 
 List of NGC objects (4001–5000)
 NGC 4889

References

External links

Lenticular galaxies
Coma Berenices
4873
44621
Astronomical objects discovered in 1863
Coma Cluster